The Agglsspitze is a mountain in South Tyrol, Italy.

References 
 Walter Klier: Alpenvereinsführer Stubaier Alpen, München 2006, 
 Eduard Richter, Die Erschließung der Ostalpen II. Band, Verlag des Deutschen und Oesterreichischen Alpenvereins, Berlin 1894
 Alpenvereinskarte 1:25.000, Blatt 31/1 Stubaier Alpen, Hochstubai
 Casa Editrice Tobacco: Carta topografica 1:25.000, Blatt 038, Vipiteno, Alpi Breonie / Sterzing, Stubaier Alpen

External links 

Mountains of the Alps
Mountains of South Tyrol
Alpine three-thousanders
Stubai Alps